Valery Khlebnikov (born 13 October 1981) is a former Russian professional ice hockey forward who used to play for Avtomobilist Yekaterinburg of the Kontinental Hockey League (KHL).

References

Living people
Avtomobilist Yekaterinburg players
1981 births
Russian ice hockey forwards